Clube de Regatas do Flamengo has a professional beach soccer team based in Brazil.

Mundialito de Clubes 2020 squad

Coach: Rogério Vilela

Honours

International competitions
Mundialito de Clubes
 Runner-Up: 2012
 Semi Final: 2011; 2019

References

Beach soccer in Brazil